Wazena (mid-6th century) was a King of the Kingdom of Aksum. He is primarily known through the Aksumite currency that was minted during his reign. Without any clear discussion, Munro-Hay identifies him with a king Alla Amidas, who is also known only through the coins he issued.

Notes

External links 
 Page showing a coin minted under Wazena

Kings of Axum
6th-century monarchs in Africa